is a city located in Gunma Prefecture, Japan. , the city had an estimated population of 46,908 in 20,589 households, and a population density of 110 persons per km². (The neighboring town of Minakami is the largest municipality in terms of area within Gunma.)

Geography
Numata is located in northern Gunma Prefecture. The Tone River flows through the western part of the city and the tributary, the Katashina River, flows through the southern end, forming a large river terrace. The downtown area is located at the top of the terrace, along the Tone River.

Mountains:  Kesamaruyama (1961m), Mount Akagi (1828m) 
Rivers: Tone River, Katashina River

Surrounding municipalities
Gunma Prefecture
 Kiryū
 Shibukawa
 Maebashi
 Midori
 Minakami
 Katashina
 Kawaba
 Shōwa
 Takayama
Tochigi Prefecture
 Nikkō

Climate
Numata has a Humid continental climate (Köppen Cfa) characterized by warm summers and cold winters with heavy snowfall.  The average annual temperature in Numata is 12.0 °C. The average annual rainfall is 1522 mm with September as the wettest month. The temperatures are highest on average in August, at around 24.7 °C, and lowest in January, at around 0.1 °C.

Demographics
Per Japanese census data, the population of Numata declined slightly over the past 40 years.

History
Numata developed during the Sengoku period as a castle town surrounding Numata Castle, a stronghold in Kōzuke Province contested by the Uesugi, Takeda, Later Hōjō and Sanada clans. During the Edo period, the area of present-day Numata was the center of the Numata Domain, a 35,000 koku feudal domain held by then Toki clan under the Tokugawa shogunate.

Numata Town was created within Tone District, Gunma Prefecture on April 1, 1889 with the creation of the modern municipalities system after the Meiji Restoration. On March 1, 1954, Numata merged with neighboring Tonami, Ikeda, Usune and Kawada villages, and was raised to city status. On February 13, 2005 the villages of Shirasawa and Tone were incorporated into Numata.

Government
Numata has a mayor-council form of government with a directly elected mayor and a unicameral city council of 20 members. Numata contributes one member to the Gunma Prefectural Assembly. In terms of national politics, the city is part of Gunma 1st district  of the lower house of the Diet of Japan.

Economy

Numata is a regional commercial center and transportation hub, but was traditionally known for lumber production.

Education
Numata has 12 public elementary schools and nine public middle schools operated by the city government, and four public high schools operated by the Gunma Prefectural Board of Education. The prefecture also operates a special education school for the handicapped.

Elementary schools
Numata Elementary School
Numata Higashi Elementary School
Numata Kita Elementary School
Masugata Elementary School 
Tonami Higashi Elementary School 
Ikeda Elementary School 
Usune Elementary School
Kawada Elementary School 
Shirasawa Elementary School
Tone Azuma Elementary School
Hiragawa Elementary School
Tone Nishi Elementary School  
Tana Elementary School

Middle schools
Numata Middle School  
Numata Minami Middle School
Numata Nishi Middle School
Numata Higashi Middle School 
Ikeda Middle School 
Usune Middle School 
Shirasawa Middle School
Tone Middle School 
Tana Middle School

High schools
Numata High School
Numata Girls' High School
Tone Jitsu High School
Oze High School

Transportation

Railway
 JR East – Jōetsu Line
  -

Highway
  – Numata IC

Local attractions

Site of Numata Castle
Fukiware Falls, National Place of Scenic Beauty and Natural Monument; One of Japan’s Top 100 Waterfalls
Oigami Onsen
Tambara Ski Park
Tamahara Dam

Sister-city relations
  Shimoda, Shizuoka, Japan, since May 1966
  Port Hardy, British Columbia, Canada since September 1994
  Füssen, Bavaria, Germany since September 1995

Notable people
Koji Omi, politician
Tochiakagi Takanori, sumo wrestler
Ukyo Sasahara, racing driver

References

External links

  
Official Website 

Cities in Gunma Prefecture
Numata, Gunma